Doka is an international producer and supplier of formwork used in all fields of the construction sector. It is a branch of the Umdasch Group AG (JSC) based in Amstetten, Austria. Doka has a worldwide workforce of 7,400, with 160 branches in 60 countries. The consolidated revenues of the Umdasch Group AG amounted to 1411 million euros in 2020.

History
Doka, umdasch The Store Makers and Umdasch Group Ventures make up the Umdasch Group AG with its headquarters located in Amstetten, Austria. In 1868 Stefan Hopferwieser founded the company St. & A. Hopferwieser as a carpenter in the town of Kollmitzberg.  During the first 80 years of the company, the company had diversified into carpentry, sawmill wood and metal manufacturing, producing among others furniture, home appliances, metal hardware and packaging. In 1949, the engineer Josef Umdasch, who was married to Mathilde Hopferwieser (granddaughter of Stefan Hopferwieser) became the managing director of the company rebuilding and restructuring it.  Josef Umdasch had been a board member of the company since 1939. In the 1950s prefabricated formwork production and store fitting production arms of the company crystallized into the two modern branches within the corporate group. In 1961 the corporate group was renamed to Umdasch KG. After Josef Umdasch retired his children Hilde and Alfred Umdasch directed the company.

Doka
In 1958 the company branch Doka was founded. The company founding and company name are interlinked with their first product and projects.  In Austria in the 1950s, large infrastructural construction was underway including several hydro electrical dams. The dams were being built on the Danube river (Donau) and its tributaries by the Austrian utility "Donaukraftwerke" or DOKW for short, translating as 'Danube power stations'. Because of the great size of these structures, traditional timber beam formwork was too labor-intensive to form the large walls.  Thus a large scale systematic and reusable formwork was developed, with the wooden formwork panels being produced and shipped from the Amstetten company.  Originally the DOKW was the delivery address, but then became the product name (DOKW boards). Linguistic usage slurred DOKW into DOKA, which became the name of the newly founded company.
In 1961 the first subsidiary was established in Germany, followed in 1977 by Brazil and Kuwait.  Since then Doka has grown to service countries in all inhabited continents, particularly in Europe and the Middle East, and in the English speaking countries Great Britain, Ireland, New Zealand, Australia, Canada and the United States. Doka has a well established office in Qatar and Saudi Arabia.

Product and service overview
The formwork products, systems and design service include formwork panels, slab formwork, wall formwork, one-sided wall formwork, climbing formwork, tunnel formwork, dam formwork, bridge formwork (cast-in-place balanced cantilever bridge, concrete arch bridge and steel combination bridge formwork), shoring / falsework, tie systems and field support, software and training.  Doka’s business is based on a combination of production, equipment sale & rental, engineering and maintenance. Most of the formwork production takes place at Doka's central plant in Amstetten.  The Doka three-ply sheets are made in the branch plant in Banská Bystrica in Slovakia.

Projects
Projects built using Doka Formwork
 One Dalton Street, Boston, Massachusetts, USA
 Stan Musial Veterans Memorial Bridge, Missouri, USA
 Aria on the Bay, Miami, USA
 Hudson Yards, New York City, USA
 220 Central Park South, New York City, USA
 Wanda Vista, Chicago, USA
 Brickell City Centre, Miami, USA
 432 Park Ave, New York City, USA
 56 Leonard Street, New York City, USA
 Three World Trade Center, New York City, USA
 Muskrat Falls (hydro-electric dam), Labrador, Canada
 Brayton Point Cooling Towers, Somerset, Massachusetts, USA 
 Lotte World Premium Tower, Seoul, South Korea
 Sutong Chang Jiang Highway Bridge, China
 Menara Carigali, Malaysia
 Juma Al Majid Tower, Dubai United Arab Emirates
 Burj Khalifa, United Arab Emirates – the core of the world’s tallest building
 Burj al Arab, United Arab Emirates – one of the most expensive hotels in the world, in Dubai
 Jamarat Bridge Makkah, Kingdom of Saudi Arabia – multi-level bridge
 Bridgewater Place, United Kingdom
 Tour CBX, France
 BMW Welt, Germany
 Vienna Skylink, Vienna Airport, Austria – enlargement of Vienna’s international airport
 Millennium Tower, Vienna, Austria
 T-Center, Austria
 Kista Science Tower, Sweden
 West Tower, Liverpool, England
 Ada Bridge, Belgrade, Serbia

Footnotes

External links

Homepage of Doka USA Ltd.
Homepage of Doka Canada Ltd.
Homepage of Umdasch Group
Homepage of Umdasch Store Makers
Homepage of Umdasch Group Ventures

Construction and civil engineering companies of Austria
Economy of Lower Austria
Construction and civil engineering companies established in 1958
Austrian companies established in 1958